Perry Haydn Taylor (born 1966) is an English creative director, designer and entrepreneur, who lives in Somerset and works in London. He is the founder and "chief stoker" of Big Fish Design, a brand, design and marketing consultancy.

Career
Haydn Taylor founded Big Fish Design in 1994, and its clients have included Yeo Valley Organic, Dorset Cereals, Sipsmith, Harrods and the BBC.

Haydn Taylor co-owns Chesil Smokery and T.G Green and was consultant Creative Director for both Gü and Boden (clothing). He is also a shareholder and advisor for Boden (clothing). He has invested in and helped to start Sofa.com, Biscuiteers, Cornishware, The Coconut Collaborative, Katherine Hooker, Tom&Co, Chesil Smokery, Alma de Cuba, Tiba Tempeh, Posh Paraphernalia and The Groovy Love Foundation. He has helped to launch Richard E Grant's perfume JACK.

He was part of the startup team for sofa.com, branding and designing the website at Big Fish. He cites it as "the most challenging and most successful digital project I've ever worked on".

Between 1998 and 2003 Lauren Child worked for Big Fish, whilst creating her early works, and includes Taylor in the dedications of her books.

He has three daughters, each named after a different typeface: Perpetua, Helvetica and Clarendon.

Awards and recognition

 Gold Design Effectiveness Award- Dorset Cereals 
 Natural & Organic Award- Best New Packaging
 Dieline Award- branding and packaging Steve's Leaves
 Pentawards- clipper tea
 Design Week Award- Gü
 Design Week commendation- Dorset Cereals

Three of his brands have appeared in Sunday Times Fast Track 100.

In 2009, Haydn Taylor was a member of the jury for the D&AD design awards.

References

External links 
 http://www.effectivedesign.org.uk/
 http://www.naturalproducts.co.uk/natural-organic-awards/
 http://www.thedielineawards.com/

1966 births
Living people
English graphic designers